The Ministry of the Interior (MOI) is a cabinet level policy-making body, governed under the Executive Yuan of the Republic of China (Taiwan). It is the fundamental executive yuan agency responsible for home affairs and security throughout Taiwan, including population, land, construction, military service administration, national emergency services, local administration systems, law enforcement and social welfare (prior to 23 July 2013).

Core functions 
It closely monitors the rights of the residents and every aspect of national development to ensure steady progress of the nation, strengthen social peace and order, and upgrade the quality of citizens' lives.

The Ministry strives to achieve the following:
 Accomplish government reform to boost government vitality;
 Care for the minorities;
 Promote a fair military service system;
 Implement pragmatic growth management to promote sustainable development;
 Reinforce police administration reform;
 Strengthen crisis management to build a comprehensive disaster prevention system;
 Manage the goals to rebuild the Nation into a beautiful hometown;
 Implement walk-around management and close planning/control

Duties 
In accordance to the Ministry of Interior Organization Act, the Ministry is charged with the following:
 National internal affairs administration.
 The Ministry bears the responsibilities to direct and monitor the highest-ranking local officials in the execution of tasks charged by the Ministry.
 For direct administration affairs, the Ministry is charged with the authority to order or take disciplinary actions against the highest-ranking local officials. When an official is suspected of conducting illegal acts or overstepping his/her authority, this local official may be suspended or removed pending a resolution from an Executive Yuan meeting.

Administrative divisions

Department structure
The Ministry is currently organized into five departments, one office, four sections, six committees, and one center to share the responsibilities.

 Department of Civil Affairs: in charge of local administration, local self-governing, border administration, public properties, political organizations, elections, religions, rites, funeral, rituals, and ceremonies, historical site investigation, maintenance, and registration, and other civil affairs.
 Department of Household Registration Affairs: in charge of household registration administration, nationality administration, population policies, census, national identification cards, name-usage and registration, migration planning, and other population affairs.
 Department of Land Administration: in charge of land surveys and registrations, land value assessments, equalization of land rights, land entitlement investigations, land consolidation, land expropriation, land utilization, territorial administration, and other land administration affairs.
 The Cooperative and Civil Associations Preparatory Office
Furthermore, the Ministry is also set up with sixteen social administration units and two land administration units, which are directly under the management of the Ministry as second level agencies.

Administrative agencies under the Ministry of Interior 
 Architecture and Building Research Institute
 Central Police University
 Construction and Planning Agency
 Land Consolidation Engineering Bureau
 National Airborne Service Corps
 National Conscription Agency
 National Fire Agency
 National Immigration Agency
 National Land Surveying and Mapping Center
 National Police Agency

Ministers

Access
The MOI building is accessible by NTU Hospital Station of the Taipei Metro on the Red Line.

See also 
 Republic of China (1912–1949)
 Taiwan
 Cabinet (government)

References

External links 

 Ministry of the Interior
 
 Ministry of the Interior on Flickr

Interior
Interior Minister
Taiwan